Grigory Aleksandrovich Gamburtsev (– June 28, 1955) was a Soviet seismologist and academician from Saint Petersburg, Russia who worked in the area of seismometry and earthquake prediction.

Life
Gamburtsev was born on March 23, 1903 in Saint Petersburg, Russia. He graduated from the Moscow State University in 1926. From 1938 onward, he worked at the Geophysical Institute of the USSR Academy of Sciences, serving as its director from 1949–55. In 1946, Gamburtsev became a corresponding member of the USSR Academy of Sciences and in 1953 he became full member of the Academy. Gamburtsev developed a new design of seismographs and created their theory. He proposed a new method for the mineral exploration, so called correlation refraction method, and the deep sounding method for monitoring the Earth crust. He died on June 28, 1955 in Moscow.

Honors
Gamburtsev received several government awards for his scientific work, including the USSR State Prize (1941), the Order of the Red Banner of Labour (1945), and the Order of Lenin (1953). The Gamburtsev Mountain Range, a range of sub-glacial mountains near Dome A in Eastern Antarctica, was discovered in 1958 by the 3rd Soviet Antarctic Expedition and named after him in the same year; Val Gamburtsev, an oil deposit in Nenets Autonomous Okrug, (part of Arkhangelsk Oblast), is also named for him.

References

External links
G.A. Gamburtsev and the problem of earthquake prediction

1903 births
1955 deaths
Scientists from Saint Petersburg
Full Members of the USSR Academy of Sciences
Stalin Prize winners
Recipients of the Order of Lenin
Recipients of the Order of the Red Banner of Labour
Russian geophysicists
Russian seismologists
Soviet inventors
Soviet physicists
Soviet seismologists